Leonard Webster may refer to:
 Lenny Webster (born 1965), baseballer
 Leonard Clarke Webster (1870–1942), Australian botanical collector